The Kattenburgervaart is a short canal in Amsterdam that runs through the Oostelijke Eilanden (Eastern Islands). 
The canal separates the island of Wittenburg, which was built in the 17th century, from the island of Kattenburg. 
The Kattenburgervaart runs parallel to the Wittenburgervaart (to the east) from the Nieuwe Vaart to the Dijksgracht.

Bridges

Four bridges cross the canal:
the Paerlduiker (bridge number 91) at the Nieuwe Vaart, between the Wittenburgergracht and Kattenburgergracht streets, which form part of the so-called Eilandboulevard.
the Kippebrug (bridge number 270), a fixed bridge for cyclists from 1923 in the Wittenburgerkade.
the Witte Katbrug (bridge number 1914), an arched bridge for pedestrians and cyclists in the Jacob Burggraafstraat.
the Zebrabrug (bridge number 389), in the Derde Wittenburgerdwarsstraat.
On the extension of the Kattenburgervaart, there were two bridges over the former Binnenhaven. 
The missing bridges are numbers 268 and 269, the last of which was also known as the Worm bridge .

See also 
Canals of Amsterdam

Notes

Sources

Canals in Amsterdam